The Daryl K. (Doc) Seaman Trophy is presented annually to the top scholastic player in the Western Hockey League. It is named for Daryl K. (Doc) Seaman, a native of Calgary who worked for years to promote the cause of higher education in junior hockey.

Winners

Blue background denotes also named CHL Scholastic Player of the Year

See also
CHL Scholastic Player of the Year
Bobby Smith Trophy - Ontario Hockey League Scholastic Player of the Year
Marcel Robert Trophy - Quebec Major Junior Hockey League Scholastic Player of the Year

References

Western Hockey League trophies and awards